Václav Matějka (born 4 July 1937) is a Czech film director and screenwriter. He directed 15 films between 1970 and 1989. His 1985 film Noc smaragdového měsíce was entered into the 35th Berlin International Film Festival.

Selected filmography
 Anděl s ďáblem v těle (1983)
 Noc smaragdového měsíce (1985)

References

External links

1937 births
Living people
Czech film directors
Czech screenwriters
Male screenwriters
People from Strakonice District